Gümüşseren is a neighbourhood in the Aşkale District of Erzurum Province in Turkey.

References

Villages in Aşkale District